Eupithecia jejunata is a moth in the family Geometridae. It is found in the United States, from eastern Texas, north into Arkansas and Missouri, east through Louisiana and Mississippi to Florida and north to coastal North Carolina.

The forewings are gray with an indistinct pattern. The hindwings are concolorous with or slightly paler than the forewings. Adults are on wing from February to mid-May. There can be a partial second generation.

References

Moths described in 1949
jejunata
Moths of North America